Margó Ingvardsson (born 16 February 1941) is a Swedish physiotherapist and retired politician. She was a Member of the Riksdag for the then Left Party Communists between 1983 and 1991.

Family 
She is the grandmother of Member of Parliament Magdalena Schröder, who has been in the Riksdag for the Moderate Party since 2018.

References 

Living people
1941 births
Members of the Riksdag from the Social Democrats
Members of the Riksdag from the Left Party (Sweden)
20th-century Swedish politicians
20th-century Swedish women politicians
Women members of the Riksdag
Swedish physiotherapists
People from Nykvarn Municipality
Members of the Riksdag 1982–1985
Members of the Riksdag 1985–1988
Members of the Riksdag 1988–1991